Carina is a locality in the Rural City of Mildura in Victoria, Australia. It is situated in the Sunraysia region on the Mallee Highway and Pinnaroo railway line. It is situated about 10 kilometres east from Panitya and 14 kilometres west from Murrayville.

Carina Post Office opened on 17 June 1923 and closed in 1949.
 
The area of the locality contains a number of smaller areas such as Mulcra which had a post office open from 1910 until 1968 and Boltons Bore.

Carina West is home to the Select Harvests Almond processing plant commissioned in 2008.

Notes and references

Towns in Victoria (Australia)
Mallee (Victoria)